Only a Shop Girl is a 1922 American silent drama film directed by Edward LeSaint and starring Estelle Taylor, Mae Busch, Wallace Beery, William Scott, James Morrison, and Josephine Adair. The film was released by Columbia Pictures on December 15, 1922.

Cast
Estelle Taylor as Mame Mulvey
Mae Busch as Josie Jerome
Wallace Beery as Jim Brennan
William Scott as Danny Mulvey
James Morrison as Charles Black
Josephine Adair as Angelina Jerome
Willard Louis as James Watkins
Claire Du Brey as Mrs. Watkins
Tully Marshall as Watkins' Store Manager

Preservation
The film is now considered lost.

References

External links

1922 drama films
Silent American drama films
1922 films
American silent feature films
American black-and-white films
Columbia Pictures films
Lost American films
1922 lost films
Lost drama films
Films directed by Edward LeSaint
1920s American films
1920s English-language films
English-language drama films